Robert Poindexter (September 25, 1897 – June 8, 1930), nicknamed "Roy", was an American Negro league pitcher in the 1920s.

Poindexter made his Negro leagues debut in 1924 with the Birmingham Black Barons. He went on to play for the Chicago American Giants during their 1926 Colored World Series championship season. In 1927 and 1928, Poindexter was back with Birmingham, and tossed a no-hitter for the Black Barons against his former Chicago team in 1928. He died in Washington, D.C., in 1930 at age 32.

References

External links
 and Seamheads

1897 births
1930 deaths
Place of birth missing
Birmingham Black Barons players
Chicago American Giants players
Memphis Red Sox players
Baseball pitchers
20th-century African-American sportspeople